Ravne pri Žireh is a small settlement in the hills south of Žiri in the Upper Carniola region of Slovenia.

Name
The name of the settlement was changed from Ravne to Ravne pri Žireh in 1953.

References

External links

Ravne pri Žireh on Geopedia

Populated places in the Municipality of Žiri